Irfan Sukkur (born 22 May 1993) is a Bangladeshi first-class and List A cricket player. He was born in Chittagong, Bangladesh. In November 2019, he was selected to play for the Rajshahi Royals in the 2019–20 Bangladesh Premier League. He scored the highest run for Rajshahi Royals on the final match of 2019–20 Bangladesh Premier League  .

References

External links
 

1993 births
Living people
Bangladeshi cricketers
People from Chittagong
Dhaka Dominators cricketers
Kala Bagan Cricket Academy cricketers
Chittagong Division cricketers
Bangladesh East Zone cricketers
Wicket-keepers